This is a list of Georgia state forests. In the state of Georgia, all state forests are managed by the Georgia Forestry Commission. All state forests are operated under a multiple-use Forest Stewardship management plan. This takes into account the wood product, wildlife, recreational, soil, aesthetic, historical, and cultural resources of the forest. Some of the state forests are also available for public recreational activities.

List of state forests 
The following table contains information on all seven state forests in Georgia.

See also 

 List of U.S. National Forests
 List of Georgia state parks

References

External links 

 Georgia Forestry Commission

Georgia
Forests